Kwon Hyuk-soo (born May 6, 1986) is a South Korean actor, singer and comedian. He made his debut on Saturday Night Live Korea.

Filmography

Films

Television series

Web series

Television shows

Web shows

Awards and nominations

References

1986 births
Living people
South Korean male television actors
South Korean male film actors
Seoul Institute of the Arts alumni